The Beckley-Raleigh County Convention Center (originally the Raleigh County Armory) is a 2,856-seat indoor arena and convention center located in Beckley, West Virginia.  It is used for basketball and is home to the West Virginia University Institute of Technology and Woodrow Wilson High School basketball teams.  It was built in 1961.

The arena, identifiable on the outside by its domed roof, contains  of exhibit and meeting space.  Adjacent to the arena are eight meeting rooms with an additional  of meeting space.  In addition to sporting events and conventions, the arena also hosts concerts, banquets and other special events.

References

External links
Official website
Geographic location and photos of the Convention Center

Indoor arenas in West Virginia
Convention centers in West Virginia
Basketball venues in West Virginia
American Basketball Association (2000–present) venues
Buildings and structures in Raleigh County, West Virginia
Tourist attractions in Raleigh County, West Virginia
West Virginia Tech Golden Bears
1961 establishments in West Virginia
Sports venues completed in 1961
College basketball venues in the United States